Cuthbert in the Mines (shown on the title screen as Cuthbert in the Mine) is  a platform game for the Dragon 32 home computer published by Microdeal in 1984. It stars Cuthbert, a character who appeared in other releases, including Cuthbert Goes Walkabout and Cuthbert Goes Digging. The gameplay is based on Frogger, but with a vertical playfield. Tandy Corporation licensed it for the TRS-80 Color Computer.

Plot
The player guides Cuthbert from hell through levels of mines while avoiding railcars and the fireball-throwing devil.

References

1984 video games
Dragon 32 games
TRS-80 Color Computer games
Video game clones
Platform games
Video games developed in the United Kingdom